Mahau Camargo Suguimati (born November 13, 1984 in São Miguel do Araguaia, Goiás) is a Brazilian track hurdler of Japanese ancestry. Since the age of eight, Suguimati had lived and studied for sixteen years in Niiza, Saitama Prefecture, Japan. Suguimati also attended schools around the prefecture, where he discovered his natural ability and talent of running and hurdling, under his personal coach and trainer Atsushi Hishinuma. He made his international debut, and represented his birth nation Brazil at the 2007 Pan American Games in Rio de Janeiro, where he finished seventh in the final of the 400 m hurdles, with his personal best time of 49.63 seconds.

Suguimati qualified for the 2008 Summer Olympics in Beijing, after claiming the gold medal from the Brazil Trophy Box in Sao Paulo, with an A-standard time of 49.15 seconds. He ran in the first heat of the men's 400 m hurdles, against six other athletes, including Bershawn Jackson of the United States, who eventually won the bronze medal in the final. He finished the race in third place by a quarter second margin (0.25) behind Jackson, and twenty-one hundredths of a second behind South Africa's Pieter de Villiers, with a time of 49.45 seconds. Suguimati qualified directly for the next round, as he secured the last mandatory place from the first heat. In the semi-final round, Suguimati, however, felt short in his bid to advance into the final round, when he placed seventh in the second heat, outside his personal best of 50.16 seconds.

At the 2011 Pan American Games in Guadalajara, Mexico, Suguimati missed out of the medal podium, when he finished fifth in the final of the men's 400 m hurdles, by two hundredths of a second faster from his first personal best, with a time of 49.61 seconds.

Personal bests
200 m: 21.62 (wind: +1.3 m/s) –  Maebashi, 27 June 2004
400 m: 46.21 –  Gifu, 8 October 2012
400 m hurdles: 48.67 –  Niigata, 3 October 2009

Achievements

References

External links

Profile – UOL Esporte 
NBC 2008 Olympics profile
Sports reference biography
Tilastopaja biography

Brazilian male hurdlers
Brazilian people of Japanese descent
Living people
Olympic athletes of Brazil
Athletes (track and field) at the 2008 Summer Olympics
Athletes (track and field) at the 2016 Summer Olympics
Athletes (track and field) at the 2011 Pan American Games
Sportspeople from Goiás
Sportspeople from Saitama Prefecture
1984 births
Athletes (track and field) at the 2015 Pan American Games
South American Games bronze medalists for Brazil
South American Games medalists in athletics
Competitors at the 2014 South American Games
Pan American Games athletes for Brazil
South American Championships in Athletics winners